The Mount Savage Castle located in Mount Savage, Maryland was built in 1840 as a plain stone house by the Union Mining Company. Before the turn of the 20th century, the house was purchased by Andre Ramsey, an immigrant from Scotland who extensively modified the house and converted it into a replica of Craig Castle near his home in Scotland.  In 1984,  the castle was renovated for use as a bed and breakfast facility.

References

External links 
 
 

Places located in Cumberland, MD-WV-PA